The 1981–82 NBA season was the SuperSonics' 15th season in the NBA.

In the playoffs, the SuperSonics defeated the Houston Rockets in three games in the First Round, before losing to the San Antonio Spurs in five games in the Semi-finals.

Draft picks

Roster

Regular season

Season standings

Record vs. opponents

Game log

Playoffs

|- align="center" bgcolor="#ccffcc"
| 1
| April 21
| Houston
| W 102–87
| Gus Williams (27)
| Jack Sikma (13)
| Gus Williams (12)
| Kingdome14,071
| 1–0
|- align="center" bgcolor="#ffcccc"
| 2
| April 23
| @ Houston
| L 70–91
| Gus Williams (18)
| Jack Sikma (11)
| four players tied (3)
| The Summit15,676
| 1–1
|- align="center" bgcolor="#ccffcc"
| 3
| April 25
| Houston
| W 104–83
| Jack Sikma (30)
| Jack Sikma (17)
| Gus Williams (12)
| Kingdome14,071
| 2–1
|-

|- align="center" bgcolor="#ffcccc"
| 1
| April 27
| San Antonio
| L 93–95
| Jack Sikma (26)
| Jack Sikma (12)
| Hanzlik, Brown (4)
| Kingdome14,457
| 0–1
|- align="center" bgcolor="#ccffcc"
| 2
| April 28
| San Antonio
| W 114–99
| Gus Williams (34)
| G. Johnson, Corzine (8)
| Gus Williams (9)
| Kingdome19,403
| 1–1
|- align="center" bgcolor="#ffcccc"
| 3
| April 30
| @ San Antonio
| L 97–99
| Gus Williams (25)
| Jack Sikma (15)
| Gus Williams (11)
| HemisFair Arena14,019
| 1–2
|- align="center" bgcolor="#ffcccc"
| 4
| May 2
| @ San Antonio
| L 113–115
| Gus Williams (33)
| James Donaldson (16)
| Gus Williams (7)
| HemisFair Arena15,002
| 1–3
|- align="center" bgcolor="#ffcccc"
| 5
| May 5
| San Antonio
| L 103–109
| Gus Williams (36)
| Jack Sikma (11)
| Gus Williams (9)
| Kingdome23,180
| 1–4
|-

Player statistics

Season

Playoffs 

Notes:
 Mark Radford did not play due to injury.

Awards and records
 Gus Williams, All-NBA First Team
 Lonnie Shelton, NBA All-Defensive Second Team
 Jack Sikma, NBA All-Defensive Second Team

Transactions

See also
 1981-82 NBA season

References

Seattle SuperSonics seasons
Sea